Railway Protection Force (RPF) is an armed Force of the Union under the administrative and operational control of Indian Railways, Ministry of Railways, Government of India established by the Railway Protection Force Act, 1957; enacted by the Indian Parliament for "the better protection and security of railway property and passenger area". It has the power to search, arrest, investigate, and prosecute offenses committed under Railway Property (Unlawful Possession) Act 1966, The Railways Act, 1989 (amended from time to time). However the power of arrests under other penal laws rests in the hands of the Government Railway Police (GRP) of state police. The force is under the authority of the Indian Ministry of Railways.

All the officers of Railway Protection Force are members of the Indian Railway Protection Force Service (IRPFS) and are recruited through UPSC Civil Services Examination. They are recruited as Group-A Central Civil Servants. However, the post of Director-General of RPF is held on deputation by a senior Indian Police Service (IPS) officer. Recruitment also occurs for various posts like sub-inspectors & constables. Such recruitments are conducted through various exams held by the Ministry of Railways, Government of India.

History

(1854-1861) 
The maintenance and security of Railways, the vital artery of national communication and economic progress has been a major concern of the Government of India that goes back to the times when the Railway commenced their operations in India in 1854. Since railways have a linear territory traversing inter-state lines, a foolproof security system has been hard to provide. Nevertheless, the genesis of such an endeavor can be traced back to 1854 when East Indian Railways employed certain staff designated as ‘Police’ to denote its own force by enacting the Police Act, 1861 and deployed a contingent for the security of the railway with the owner companies bearing their upkeep. The Railway Companies exercised full control over the Police Force.

(1861-1956) 
On the recommendation of Railway Police Committee, 1872, Railway Police was organized into ‘Govt. Police’ (The precursor of GRP) for Law enforcement and ‘Company Police’ (The precursor of RPF) for Watch and Ward duties in Railways. The actual separation of duties came into effect in 1881. By 1882, as a result of formal division of the Police Force deployed on the railways into “Government Police” and “Private (Companies) Police”, the Railway Companies directly assumed the responsibility of protection and Security of their property as well as of the goods entrusted to them by public for carriage. For this, they appointed “Chowkidars” for various departments and placed them under control of their local departmental heads. With an increase in commercial traffic and consequential steep rise in the incidence of theft of goods entrusted to railways for carriage, the “Chowkidar” system was reorganized after the first World War onto Watch & Ward organization under a single superior  officer designated as Superintendent, Watch & Ward – a system which continued up to 1954.Thus the Railway Police Administration functioned under three different systems viz the district system, as a part of District Police; the provincial system, for each province and the Railway Administration system, separate Railway Police for each Railway Administration inspite of recommendations of Indian Police commission, 1902-03. The provincial system found acceptance on recommendation of Railway Police Committee, 1921 and the present GRP came into existence. The ‘Company Police’ evolved into present RPF in 1957 passing through "Watch and Ward" phase from 1872-1954, and as "Railway Security Force" from  1954-1956. RPF was also given limited legal powers under Railway Stores (Unlawful Possession) Act.

(1957-1985) 

Thus, for a full 100 years, the Force though being used for providing security to the vital artery of national communication and economic progress did not itself have any legislative status. Therefore the Govt. instituted  a  special  enquiry  through  Director, Intelligence Bureau (Ministry of Home Affairs) who in his report in 1954 forcefully brought out  the  necessity  of  organising  the  Watch  &  Ward  on  a statutory basis.  The Railway Board  also  appointed  a  Security  Adviser  to the Railway Board in July, 1953 to work out the  details  for  the  reorganisation  of  the  Watch  &  Ward department.  It was decided in consultation  with  the  Ministry  of  Home  Affairs  that  there  should be an integrated well organised force on the model of the Police with adequate supervisory staff specially trained to  meet  the  particular  aspects of crime that were relevant to Railway property  and to work in close collaboration  and  act  as  a  second  line  to  the  States  Police  with  whom,  under  the Constitution,  policing  on  Railways  rested.  This  led  to  the  R.P.F.  Bill  for  the better protection and security. It was only on 29 August 1957 that a Railway Protection Force  Act was enacted by the Parliament and Railway Security Force was renamed as Railway Protection Force.  The RPF Rules were made on 10 September 1959 and RPF Regulations  wee formulated in 1966.In the meantime in 1962 “Special Emergency Force” has been raised from the existing strength of RPF during Chinese Aggression, which was especially entrusted the task to protect trains in border districts. In 1965 it has been renamed as “Railway Protection Special Force”. In 1966 RPF has been given legal powers for better protection of Railway property by enacting Railway Property (Unlawful Possession.) Act.

But, while the provisions of RPF Act were soon found wanting for the maintenance of an effective and disciplined Force, the RPF Rules and Regulations too were found judicially unsound. The RPF Act, 1957 was accordingly modified by Parliament vide Act No.60 of 1985 on 20 September 1985 for the constitution and maintenance of the Force as an armed force of the Union.  For carrying out the purposes of the Act, RPF Rules 1987 was framed.

(2010–2020) 
The percentage of women in the RPF is the highest among all central paramilitary forces in India. It stands at 10% as of March 2019.

Structure (Gazetted officers) 
The Gazetted IRPFS Officers utilises a similar rank structure to the IPS (Indian Police Service). Non-gazetted ranks are the same as those used in the State Police Services. The job profile differs for each position

Ranks

Gazetted Officers

Non-gazetted officers

Governance 

The governance of RPF is based on the following relevant legislation, rules and directives.

 Railway Protection Force Act, 1957
 Railway Property (Unlawful Possession) Act, 1966
 Railway Protection Force Rules, 1987 – Laid, by the central government, as per provisions under RPF Act, 1957.
 Railway Protection Force Directives, 1987

References

External links 
 Official website of the Railway Protection Force

Ministry of Railways (India)
Federal law enforcement agencies of India
Railroad police agencies
Specialist law enforcement agencies of India
1872 establishments in British India
Government agencies established in 1872